István Biró (born 25 September 1951) is a politician in Serbia. He served in the Assembly of Vojvodina from 2008 to 2016 as a member of the Democratic Party (Demokratska stranka, DS). He is now a member of the People's Party (Narodna stranka, NS).

Private career
Biró is from Mali Iđoš, Vojvodina. He is a medical doctor and has worked as a general practitioner.

Politician
Biró ran for mayor of Mali Iđoš in the 2004 Serbian local elections, appearing as the joint candidate of the Social Democratic Party (Socijaldemokratska partija, SDP) and the Reformists of Vojvodina (Reformisti Vojvodine, RV). He was defeated in the first round of voting.

He later joined the DS and was elected for the Mali Iđoš constituency seat in the 2008 Vojvodina provincial election. The DS and its allies won a majority victory, and Biró served as a supporter of the administration. He also appeared in the second position on the DS's electoral list for the Mali Iđoš municipal assembly in the concurrent 2008 local elections and was given a mandate after the list won seven seats, placing second against the Hungarian Coalition.

In 2009, he was appointed to the program committee of Radio Television of Vojvodina.

Biró was re-elected to the Vojvodina assembly in the 2012 provincial election. The DS and its allies won a plurality victory and formed a coalition government, and Biró again served as a government supporter for the next four years. Vojvodina adopted a system of full proportional representation for the 2016 provincial election, and Biró appeared in the eighty-third position on the DS's list; the list won only ten mandates, and he was not returned for a third term.

He subsequently left the DS and, as of 2020, is the commissioner of the People's Party in Mali Iđoš.

Electoral record

Provincial (Vojvodina)

Municipal (Mali Iđoš)

References

1951 births
Living people
People from Mali Iđoš
Members of the Assembly of Vojvodina
Democratic Party (Serbia) politicians
People's Party (Serbia, 2017) politicians